In literature, an archenemy (sometimes spelled as arch-enemy) is the main enemy of someone. In fiction, it is a character who is the protagonist's, commonly a hero's, most prominent and most-known enemy.

Etymology
The word archenemy sometimes spelled as arch-enemy originated around the mid-16th century, from the words arch- (from Greek ἄρχω archo meaning 'to lead') and enemy.

An archenemy may also be referred to as an archrival, archfoe, archvillain, or archnemesis. However, an archenemy may also be distinguished from a nemesis, with the latter being an enemy whom the hero cannot defeat (or who defeats the hero), even while not being a longstanding or consistent enemy to the hero.

See also
 Antagonist
 Supervillain
 Villain

References

Rivalry
Stock characters
Superhero fiction themes
Supervillains